Va'a, also called the outrigger canoe, for the 2013 Pacific Mini Games, was held in Gahi village and its namesake bay area. It is located in the southeast coast of Wallis and Futuna. Competition for this sport was on the 3 to 6 September 2013.

Medal table
Key:

Medal summary

Men

Women

References

 Sept. 3, 2013 Results
 Sept. 4, 2013 Results
 Sept. 5, 2013 Results
 Sept. 6, 2013 Results

Outrigger canoeing at the Pacific Games
2013 in canoeing
2013 Pacific Mini Games